Miscellaneous Sporting Club is a football club based in Serowe, Botswana. Miscellaneous is also known as Tsenala (the red and white), Mmamonotwane, the official nicknames of the club. The club is also often referred to as Matswakabele (Miscellaneous), a nickname that developed in the early days but has never been officially adopted by the club. 

Miscellaneous Sporting Club is a soccer club based in Serowe, Botswana. The club is currently playing in the Botswana Premier League. The club's colours are red, white and green.

The team is owned by its supporters, whose membership of the club qualifies them to be a part of the Miscellaneous SC’s inner sanctum. The society membership elects the Miscellaneous executive committee at annual general meetings (AGM). The team has a strong following outside Botswana, most notably in Scotland.

Club Administration

The club is currently administered by an executive committee comprising Seiphetho Sefhako(Chairman), Musa Morapedi (Vice Chairman), Orapeleng Mosiamisi (Secretary General), Acob Monyeki (Vice Secretary), Mpho Outule(General Manager), Edwin Ntau (Public Relations Officer), Thuso Molosiwa (Treasurer), Bakadzi Seoganeleng(Marketing Manager), and Additional Members Bathusi Mosweu and Keitumetse Tuelo.

History

The last time Miscellaneous competed in the elite league was in the 1970s when there was only National First Division. That was then and since their demotion to the lower ranks, the Serowe side has struggled to make ends meet. 

The first President of Botswana, late Sir Seretse Khama when he returned from exile, formed Miscellaneous in 1962. At the time, Khama is reported to have found Motherwell being the only side in the village. He formed Miscellaneous and recruited some players from Motherwell. Khama found it strange that there can only be one team in Serowe and wanted Miscellaneous to challenge Motherwell.

Miscellaneous became a household name and produced a number of players who have gone to shine at other Gaborone sides like Township Rollers, Gaborone United and BDF XI.

If you look at the history of Serowe, the royal family led all the teams. Seretse handed the team to his son Ian in the 70s and has since remained the life president of the club.

Miscellaneous has always produced brilliant players but were disadvantaged by lack of job openings in the village.  The likes of [[OG Godirwang]], Mmoloki 'Zara' Ramanoko, Keikotlhae Botlhoko and lately Patrick Mathaba have all deserted the Serowe giants to seek greener pastures south of Dibete cordon gate. This saw Miscellaneous struggling to find their footing.

Current squad

References 

Football clubs in Orapa
1962 establishments in Bechuanaland Protectorate
Football clubs in Botswana